Gregorio "Goyo" Manzano Ballesteros (born 11 March 1956) is a Spanish football manager.

In a career of 35 years, he managed for 14 consecutive seasons in La Liga with seven clubs, including three spells at Mallorca and two at Atlético Madrid, winning the Copa del Rey with the former in 2003. In the 2010s, he led three teams in the Chinese Super League.

Football career

Early career (1983–1999)
Born in Bailén, Jaén, Andalusia, Manzano's training career started in 1983 at the age of 27. He took charge of several teams in his native region, including Real Jaén in the Tercera División.

In 1996, Manzano signed with Talavera CF from Segunda División B. During his two-season spell he led the Castile-La Mancha team to a second-place finish in their group (1996–97), and a narrow miss on promotion (1997–98). His good work there prompted the interest – and signing – from Segunda División club CD Toledo, which he helped retain their league status with a seventh place.

Six clubs in six years (1999–2005)
Manzano had his first La Liga experience with Real Valladolid, in 1999–2000. His new side finished eighth, and the season included a 1–0 win against Real Madrid at the Santiago Bernabéu Stadium. For the following campaign, he stayed in the top flight with Racing de Santander; in spite of a 4–0 home victory over FC Barcelona, the Cantabrians were relegated and the coach was fired.

After helping Rayo Vallecano finish 11th in 2001–02's top division, Manzano signed for RCD Mallorca. Season highlights were another win at Real Madrid (5–1) and the conquest of the Copa del Rey after beating Recreativo de Huelva.

Subsequently, Manzano joined Atlético Madrid, nearly qualifying the side for the UEFA Cup after finishing seventh. After the sacking of Iñaki Sáez as Spain national team coach, he was rumoured to be one of his possible successors, but nothing came of it, and he took charge of Málaga CF instead.

Mallorca and Atlético returns and Sevilla (2005–2013)
On 15 February 2006, Manzano returned to Mallorca after Héctor Cúper's dismissal, and continued to work with the Balearic Islands club the following seasons. In 2009–10 they won their first ten home fixtures, eventually only losing three of 19 in the league (Sevilla FC, Barcelona and Real Madrid) and qualifying for the Europa League as fifth.

On 19 May 2010, it was announced Mallorca would not renew Manzano's contract despite his achievements, due to financial difficulties. He returned to active on 26 September, being appointed at Sevilla as a replacement for the fired Antonio Álvarez. His debut four days later was the first European game of his career, a 1–0 win at Borussia Dortmund in the Europa League group stage.

On 8 June 2011, after leading Sevilla to fifth place, with the subsequent Europa League qualification, Manzano returned to Atlético Madrid after replacing Quique Sánchez Flores. Early into 2011–12, he and José Antonio Reyes had a serious altercation which resulted in the player being relegated to the bench and sometimes not even selected for matchday squads.

Manzano was relieved of his duties on 22 December 2011, following a 1–0 home and 3–1 aggregate loss against Albacete Balompié in the domestic cup, with the team ranking tenth in the domestic league. On 5 February 2013, he returned to Mallorca for a third spell after Joaquín Caparrós was dismissed, as the campaign went on to end in top-tier relegation.

Chinese Super League (2014–2018)
On 11 February 2014, Manzano was appointed at Beijing Guoan F.C. of the Chinese Super League. His two years in the capital city resulted in second and fourth-place finishes, respectively. 

Manzano remained working in the same competition in the ensuing years, taking Shanghai Shenhua F.C. to fourth in his only season (2016). He arrived at Guizhou Hengfeng Zhicheng a year later, replacing Li Bing and taking the team to eighth, before being dismissed for a poor start in June 2018.

Managerial statistics

Honours
Mallorca
Copa del Rey: 2002–03

Individual
Don Balón Award – Coach of the Year: 2008
Chinese Football Association Coach of the Year: 2014

References

External links

1956 births
Living people
Sportspeople from the Province of Jaén (Spain)
Spanish football managers
La Liga managers
Segunda División managers
Segunda División B managers
Tercera División managers
Real Jaén managers
CD Toledo managers
Real Valladolid managers
Racing de Santander managers
Rayo Vallecano managers
RCD Mallorca managers
Atlético Madrid managers
Málaga CF managers
Sevilla FC managers
Chinese Super League managers
Beijing Guoan F.C. managers
Shanghai Shenhua F.C. managers
Guizhou F.C. managers
Spanish expatriate football managers
Expatriate football managers in China
Spanish expatriate sportspeople in China